GameTrailers TV with Geoff Keighley (or GT.TV) is a television show about video games hosted by video game journalist Geoff Keighley. Originally titled Game Head, on January 25, 2008, the show relaunched under its current name with a slightly different format and further incorporation of GameTrailers hosts, Amanda MacKay and Daniel Kayser. The series airs Friday nights at different times (depending on the previous programming) at 12am, 12:30am, 1am, and 1:30am Eastern Time on Spike in the U.S. and Canada.

Series overview
In the program, host Geoff Keighley, along with his correspondents, are seen on location at video game companies or interviewing with special guests while divulging exclusive information on upcoming video games. During the program, video game previews, reviews, new gadgets, and trivia facts about the video games are featured.

Notable episodes
Past episodes have included interviews with film director Uwe Boll, former Nintendo of America President and Chief Operating Officer Reggie Fils-Aime, professional video gamer Johnathan "Fatal1ty" Wendel, and fashion designer Marc Ecko.

Episodes have also focused on the "Best of E3" in their E3 2006 and E3 2007 episode, featuring editors from internet gaming site GameSpot. Other episodes have featured the Academy of Interactive Arts & Sciences's D.I.C.E. Summit, including an interview with the former head of Microsoft's Interactive Entertainment Business division Peter Moore, the 8th Annual Independent Games Festival, PAX East, and Spike TV Video Game Awards (VGAs).

Ratings
According to Spike TV, GT.TV is the highest rated video game show on television, and consistently has higher ratings than anything on G4 or MTV2.

Hosts
Geoff Keighley (2005–present) - Video game journalist for online, print and television, freelance writer, and executive producer. Former correspondent for G4TV's The Electric Playground.
Amanda MacKay (2007–present) - On-location host, actress, and producer.
Daniel Kayser (2007–present) - On-location correspondent and interviewer.
iJustine (2010–present) - On-location gadget correspondent, and actress.

Celebrity guests
A number of celebrities have also appeared as guests, including Clint Eastwood, Kiefer Sutherland, Tobey Maguire, Kirsten Dunst, and even Triumph the Insult Comic Dog.

Game Head: Episode Guide

Season 1 (2005)
 101 – Frag Dolls profile show
 102 – The Nintendo Fusion Tour with Fall Out Boy
 103 – Star Wars: Battlefront II Show, shot at LucasArts/LucasFilm's new office in San Francisco, CA
 104 – Spike TV Video Game Awards Nomination Special
 105 – Xbox 360 Launch Special
 106 – Fight Night Round 3
 107 – Spike TV Video Game Awards Post-Show
 108 – University of Southern California Videogame Program Show
 109 – 1UP/Ziff Davis 2006 Preview Show

Season 2 (2006)
 201 – Blur Studios, a 3D animation company
 202 – The Collective, developer of The Da Vinci Code and Star Wars Episode III: Revenge of the Sith video games
 203 – Uwe Boll, infamous videogame filmmaker
 204 – Alex Ward, game designer of Burnout and BLACK
 205 – Marc Ecko about his game, Marc Ecko's Getting Up: Contents Under Pressure
 206 – Reggie Fils-Aime, A profile of Nintendo's top North American executive
 207 – Academy of Interactive Arts & Sciences's D.I.C.E. Summit
 208 – EA Los Angeles. This show featured an exclusive preview for Medal of Honor: Airborne
 209 – Training Day with Johnathan "Fatal1ty" Wendel.
 210 – The Godfather: The Game Shot at Paramount Pictures backlot in Hollywood, CA
 211 – NBA Ballers Phenom
 212 – Kingdom Hearts II
 213 – The Sundance of Gaming. Shot at the Game Developers Conference in San Jose, CA  Features Cliff Bleszinski from Epic Games

Season 3 (2006)
 301 – I Am 8 Bit Art Exhibit at Gallery 1988 in Los Angeles, CA
 302 – Ubisoft Montreal Show shot in Montreal, QC, Canada
 303 – E3 2006 Special
 304 – X-Men: The Official Game
 305 – E3 Game Critics Awards Show
 306 – Mega64
 307 – Pandemic Studios
 308 – Video Games Live Music Concert, shot in Philadelphia, PA
 309 – Sex and Videogames
 310 – God of War II
 311 – The Madden NFL 07 Kickoff Party at the ESPN SportsZone in New York City, NY
 312 – Resident Evil: Extinction. On the set of the new movie in Mexico City, Mexico
 313 – San Diego Comic-Con 2006
 314 – Red vs. Blue from Buda, TX, and the world exclusive look at Command & Conquer 3: Tiberium Wars gameplay
 315 – QuakeCon 2006.
 316 – Game On: The History of Videogames
 317 – The Warped Tour – Thirty Seconds to Mars, Less Than Jake and other bands discuss lending songs to videogames
 318 – The cast of Family Guy discuss their new video game
 319 – The PlayStation 3 game Resistance: Fall of Man from Insomniac Games
 320 – Scarface: The World is Yours in Miami with Steven Bauer (Manny in the film).
 321 – The Sopranos: Road to Respect with show creator David Chase and actor Vincent Pastore (Big Pussy) 
 322 – Warner Brothers Interactive and Superman Returns: The Game
 323 – Uwe Boll on the set of his new film Postal
 324 – Call of Duty 3 Challenge
 325 – PlayStation 3 launch special
 326 – Nintendo Wii launch special with Reggie Fils-Aime
 327 – 2006 Spike TV Video Game Awards hour-long special

Season 4 (2007)
During the 2006 Spike TV Video Game Awards on December 13, 2006, a 30-second commercial revealed that Game Head will return for a fourth season in 2007. Commercials stated that new episodes would premiere on Fridays at 1AM in January. However, the first new episode actually aired on Friday, February 2, 2007. The start of season 4 brought with it a new logo and new graphics throughout the show. Other new additions include a ratings score for game reviews, based on a 10-point scale, and a Game Head Icon segment, highlighting an iconic character in video game history. Also, a feature called Open World lists the top-selling games at a given independent video game retailer.

 401 – 2007 videogame preview show from the offices of IGN in San Francisco, CA (February 2, 2007)
 402 – Behind the scenes at Sega
 403 – Madden Bowl 2007 from Miami, FL
 404 – DICE Convention 2007 with Nintendo, Sony, and Microsoft
 405 – NBA All-Star Game in Las Vegas
 406 – Atari founder Nolan Bushnell
 407 – God of War II Special with David Jaffe
 408 – Fable creator Peter Molyneux plus a feature on Kotaku
 409 – Inside Nintendo Power Magazine
 410 – Alternative Reality Gaming at 42 Entertainment
In keeping with the ARG theme, Game Head had a URL and images of Shigeru Miyamoto – hidden in split-second images flashed on the screen – to a trailer for the next episode: a Super Tribute to Shigeru Miyamoto. The link was "miyamoto.spiketv.com"
 411 – Shigeru Miyamoto: A Super Tribute
 412 – Inside Valve for Team Fortress 2
 413 – Halo 3 Multiplayer Beta Special
 414 – Pirates of the Caribbean: At World's End
 415 – Big Buck Hunter Pro and Eugene Jarvis
 416 – A look at Star Wars games at Star Wars Celebration IV
 417 – Video game modder Ben Heckendorn
 418 – The Voice of Mario: Charles Martinet
 419 – Naughty Dog on Uncharted: Drake's Fortune
This episode was re-aired in January 2008 with an updated Head Start news segment
 420 – Gears of War creators Epic Games
 421 – E3 2007 Special
 422 – E3 Hangover Special
 423 – Comic-Con 2007 with David Jaffe, Uwe Boll and the casts of Iron Man and Heroes
 424 – Madden NFL 08 launch from Times Square
 425 – Stranglehold special
 426 – EA Chicago
 427 – Projekt Revolution Tour 2007
 428 – EA Summer Showcase
 429 – Halo 3: LAUNCHED!
 430 – Hollywood and Games
 431 – World Cyber Games
 432 – Call of Duty 4 creators Infinity Ward
 433 – The writers of The Simpsons
 434 – E For All Expo 2007
 435 – Mass Effect at BioWare
 436 – Harmonix the creators of Rock Band
 437 – Videogame Violence with Jack Thompson
 438 – Game Head Best of 2007
 439 - Game Head: A Mockumentary (Online Short)

GameTrailers TV (GT.TV) Episode Guide

Season 1 (2008)
In January 2008 it was announced that the 5th season Game Head would be relaunched as GameTrailers TV with Geoff Keighley, further aligning the show with MTV's popular gaming site GameTrailers.  The format of the show is largely the same as Game Head, although game reviews are now handled by GameTrailers.com so the scores match those on the website. The show was also re-launched in high-definition on SpikeHD and is available in HD on GameTrailers.com and Xbox Live Marketplace.

 101 – The world premiere of Tiberium with EA Los Angeles
 102 – Turok creators Propaganda Games
 103 – The Most Anticipated Games of 2008
 104 – Madden Bowl 2008 with Peter Moore
 105 – D.I.C.E. Summit 2008
 106 – 2008 Game Developers Conference
 107 – Iron Man creators Secret Level
 108 – Star Wars: The Force Unleashed Special from LucasArts
 109 – The Bourne Conspiracy creators High Moon Studios
 110 – Brothers in Arms: Hell's Highway creators Gearbox Software
 111 – Ghostbusters: The Video Game creators Terminal Reality
 112 – Dead Space creators EA Redwood Shores
 113 – FaceBreaker creators EA Canada
 114 – Resistance 2 with Insomniac Games
 115 – Lord of the Rings: Conquest with Pandemic Studios
 116 – Prototype with Radical Entertainment
 117 - Mortal Kombat vs. DC Universe with Midway Games
 118 – Gears of War 2 with Epic Games
 119 - E3 2008 Special
 120 - Comic-Con 2008
 121 - The Godfather II with Electronic Arts
 122 - TNA Impact! with TNA wrestlers and Midway Games
 123 - 2008 Penny Arcade Expo
 124 - Halo Wars with Ensemble Studios
 125 - Fallout 3 with Bethesda Game Studios
 126 - Call of Duty: World at War with Treyarch
 127 - Skate 2 with EA Canada
 128 - Wanted: Weapons of Fate with GRIN and F.E.A.R. 2: Project Origin with Monolith Productions
 129 - 2008 Spike Video Game Awards preview special

Season 2 (2009)
 201 - Most Anticipated Games of 2009
 202 - Grand Theft Auto IV: The Lost and Damned with Rockstar Games
 203 - inFamous with Sucker Punch Productions
 204 - D.I.C.E. Summit 2009
 205 - Alpha Protocol with Obsidian Entertainment
 206 - Wolfenstein with Raven Software
 207 - BioWare special
 208 - 2009 Game Developers Conference
 209 - Fight Night Round 4 with Electronic Arts
 210 - Mafia II with 2K Games
 211 - Army of Two: The 40th Day with EA Montreal
 212 - Tony Hawk: Ride with Robomodo
 213 - Heavy Rain with Quantic Dream
 214 - E3 2009 Preview
 215 - E3 2009
 216 - Dante's Inferno with Visceral Games
 217 - Uncharted 2: Among Thieves with Naughty Dog
 218 - Brütal Legend with Double Fine Productions
 219 - Comic-Con 2009
 220 - Valve special
 221 - Halo 3: ODST with Bungie
 222 - LucasArts special
 223 - Ratchet & Clank Future: A Crack in Time with Insomniac Games
 224 - Call of Duty: Modern Warfare 2 with Infinity Ward
 225 - Grand Theft Auto: The Ballad of Gay Tony with Rockstar North
 226 - BioShock 2 with 2K Marin
 227 - Nintendo special
 228 - Mass Effect 2 with BioWare

Season 3 (2010)
301 - Battlefield: Bad Company 2 (January 21, 2010)
302 - Most Anticipated Games 2010 (January 28, 2010)
303 - Splinter Cell Conviction (February 11, 2010)
304 - X10 Convention (February 18, 2010)
305 - God of War III (February 25, 2010)
306 - TBA (March 5, 2010)
307 - TBA (March 12, 2010)
308 - GDC 2010 (March 19, 2010)
309 - Halo: Reach (April 4, 2010)
310 - Red Dead Redemption (May 8, 2010)
311 - TBA (May 15, 2010)
312 - Spiderman: Shattered Dimensions (May 22, 2010)
313 - Bulletstorm (May 29, 2010)
314 - Crysis 2 (June 5, 2010)
315 - TBA (June 12, 2010)
316 - The Big 3 at E3 (June 18, 2010)
317 - Deadliest Warrior (July 3, 2010)
318 - God of War III/Fallout: New Vegas (July 24, 2010)
319 - Comic Con 2010 (July 31, 2010)
320 - TBA (August 14, 2010)
321 - Portal 2 (August 21, 2010)
322 - Halo: Reach/Bungie (August 28, 2010)
323 - Dead Space 2 (September 11, 2010)
324 - Star Wars: The Force Unleashed 2 (September 18, 2010)
325 - Epic Mickey (September 25, 2010)
326 - Call of Duty: Black Ops (October 15, 2010)
327 - Rock Band 3 (October 22, 2010)
328 - Mortal Kombat (October 29, 2010)
329 - Fall Games Preview (November 5, 2010)
330 - Back to the Future: The Game (December 3, 2010)
331 - 2010 VGA Preview (December 10, 2010)

Season 4 (2011)
401 - Fight Night Champion/Twisted Metal (January 29, 2011)
402 - Nintendo 3DS (February 4, 2011)
403 - Duke Nukem Forever/Madden Bowl 2011 (February 11, 2011)
404 - Infamous 2/SOCOM 4 (February 24, 2011)
405 - GDC 2011 Special (March 3, 2011)
406 - Rage (March 8, 2011)
407 - PAX East (March 11, 2011)
408 - L.A. Noire/Twisted Metal (April 15, 2011)
409 - Elder Scrolls V: Skyrim/Uncharted 3: Drake's Deception (April 22, 2011)
410 - Sony Surprise: Starhawk/Madden NFL 12 (Top 5 Most Anticipated Games at E3) (May 13, 2011)
411 - Countdown to E3 2011 (May 26, 2011)
412 - E3 First Look (Exclusive E3 2011 Trailers) (June 3, 2011)
Special - GT.TV Presents: E3 2011 All Access Live (June 6, 2011)
413 - BioShock Infinite (15 minute trailer from E3) (July 8, 2011)
414 - Resistance 3 (July 22, 2011)
415 - Comic-Con 2011: Saint's Row: The Third/Mass Effect 3/Batman: Arkham City (July 29, 2011)
416 - Saints Row: The Third (August 12, 2011)
417 - Gears of War 3 (August 19, 2011)
418 - Fall Preview/GamesCon/Kotaku.com (August 26, 2011)
419 - NBA 2K12/PAX '11 (September 2, 2011)
420 - Assassin's Creed: Revelations (September 9, 2011)
421 - Batman: Arkham City (September 16, 2011)
Special - GameStop All Access (Battlefield 3/Assassin's Creed: Revelations/Uncharted 3: Drake's Deception/Batman: Arkham City) (September 16, 2011)
422 - Aliens & Syndicate (Aliens: Colonial Marines/Syndicate) (September 30, 2011)

Season 5 (2012)
501 - Battlefield 3 (October 7, 2011)
502 - Call of Duty: Modern Warfare 3 (October 14, 2011)
503 - Elder Scrolls V: Skyrim (October 21, 2011)
504 - Nintendo Exclusives (w/ Reggie Fils-Aime) (The Legend of Zelda: Skyward Sword) (October 28, 2011)
505 - The Simpsons E3 Parody/Spike Video Game Awards Nominees (November 11, 2011)
506 - GameStop Unwrapped (The biggest games of the season)/World Premiere DLC (November 25, 2011)
507 - VGA Games of the Year (Spike's VGA nominees of the year) (December 9, 2011)
508 - Mass Effect 3/CES 2012 (January 20, 2012)
509 - Spring Preview: Madden Bowl 2012/Starhawk/MLB 12: The Show/Darksiders II/Syndicate (February 10, 2012)
510 - DICE Summit2012/Transformers: Fall of Cybertron/Sleeping Dogs (February 17, 2012)
511 - Xbox 360 Spring Showcase/Halo 4/Forza Horizon (March 9, 2012)
512 - GDC 2012 (San Francisco Game Developer's Conference)/Tony Hawk's Pro Skater HD/Bellator: MMA Onslaught (March 16, 2012)
513 - Junction Point Studio Visit: Disney's Epic Mickey 2: The Power of Two (March 23, 2012)
514 - FreddieW (April 6, 2012)
515 - Medal of Honor: Warfighter (April 13, 2012)
516 - PlayStation 3 Exclusive Game: PlayStation All-Stars Battle Royale (April 27, 2012)
Special - GT.TV presents Max Payne 3 (May 4, 2012)
517 - Transformers Fall of Cybertron (May 11, 2012)
518 - Far Cry 3 (May 18, 2012)
519 - E3 2012 First Look Special (Star Wars: 1313/Guardians of Middle-earth/Metal Gear Rising: Revengeance/Castlevania: Lords of Shadow 2/Dishonored/Tomb Raider) (May 31, 2012)
520 - Epic Games (June 8, 2012)
521 - Dead Space 3 (June 15, 2012)
522 - Tomb Raider (June 22, 2012)
523 - Borderlands 2/Vid Con 2012 (July 13, 2012)
524 - Dishonored (August 3, 2012)
525 - Valve (Dota 2/Source Film Maker/Steam/QuakeCon) (August 17, 2012)
526 - Media Molecule/Forza Horizon (September 7, 2012)
527 - Fuse (September 14, 2012)
528 - Halo 4 (September 21, 2012)
529 - Assassin's Creed III (September 28, 2012)

Season 6 (2013)
601 - Need For Speed: Most Wanted and Medal of Honor: Warfighter (October 5, 2012)
602 - Call of Duty: Black Ops 2 (October 12, 2012)
603 - God of War: Ascension (November 9, 2012)
604 - VGA 10 Nomination Special (December 7, 2012)
605 - CES 2013 (January 18, 2013)
606 - Star Trek/Star Wars Pinball (February 22, 2013)
607 - South by Southwest/Metal Gear Solid V: The Phantom Pain (March 15, 2013)
608 - GDC 2013/Battlefield 4 (April 12, 2013)
609 - Behind the Scenes: Microsoft Xbox One (May 24, 2013)
610 - Pre-E3 2013 Countdown (Dying Light/Yaiba: Ninja Gaiden Z) (June 7, 2013)
612 - Penny Arcade Expo 2013 (PAX) (September 13, 2013)

Season 7 (2013)
701 - Killzone: Shadow Fall/Batman: Arkham Origins (October 18, 2013)
702 - Xbox & Nintendo Fall Preview (November 7, 2013)
Special - PS4 All Access: Greatness Awaits (Special) (November 14, 2013)
Special - Xbox One: Day One Countdown (Special) (November 21, 2013)
703 - Donkey Kong Country: Tropical Freeze (November 22, 2013)

References

External links
 

Spike (TV network) original programming
Television shows about video games
2005 American television series debuts
2008 American television series endings
2008 American television series debuts
2013 American television series endings
English-language television shows